The Puttalam Polling Division is a Polling Division in the Puttalam Electoral District, in the North Western Province, Sri Lanka.

Presidential Election Results

Summary 

The winner of Puttalam has matched the final country result 4 out of 8 times.

2019 Sri Lankan Presidential Election

2015 Sri Lankan Presidential Election

2010 Sri Lankan Presidential Election

2005 Sri Lankan Presidential Election

1999 Sri Lankan Presidential Election

1994 Sri Lankan Presidential Election

1988 Sri Lankan Presidential Election

1982 Sri Lankan Presidential Election

Parliamentary Election Results

Summary 

The winner of Puttalam has matched the final country result 5 out of 7 times. Hence, Puttalam is a Weak Bellwether for Parliamentary Elections.

2015 Sri Lankan Parliamentary Election

2010 Sri Lankan Parliamentary Election

2004 Sri Lankan Parliamentary Election

2001 Sri Lankan Parliamentary Election

2000 Sri Lankan Parliamentary Election

1994 Sri Lankan Parliamentary Election

1989 Sri Lankan Parliamentary Election

Demographics

Ethnicity 

The Puttalam Polling Division has a Moor majority (56.3%), a significant Sinhalese population (31.6%) and a significant Sri Lankan Tamil population (10.5%) . In comparison, the Puttalam Electoral District (which contains the Puttalam Polling Division) has a Sinhalese majority (73.6%) and a significant Moor population (19.4%)

Religion 

The Puttalam Polling Division has a Muslim majority (57.2%), a significant Roman Catholic population (21.0%) and a significant Buddhist population (14.7%) . In comparison, the Puttalam Electoral District (which contains the Puttalam Polling Division) has a Buddhist plurality (43.2%), a significant Roman Catholic population (31.5%) and a significant Muslim population (19.7%)

References 

Polling Divisions of Sri Lanka
Polling Divisions of the Puttalam Electoral District